Gilston Park is a Grade II* listed country house in Gilston, Hertfordshire, England. It was designed by Philip Hardwick for John Hodgson around 1852.

References

External links

Grade II* listed buildings in Hertfordshire
Buildings and structures completed in 1852
Country houses in Hertfordshire
Grade II* listed houses